National Assembly for Wales (Remuneration) Measure 2010 (nawm 4) is a Measure of the National Assembly for Wales that regulates how assembly members are paid. The measure creates an independent remuneration body that makes decisions about AM's pay and expenses.

References
http://www.legislation.gov.uk/mwa/2010/4
http://www.assemblywales.org/bus-home/bus-third-assembly/bus-legislation-third-assembly/bus-leg-measures/bus-legislation-measures-proposed_remuneration.htm

Measures of the National Assembly for Wales
2010 in British law
2010 in Wales